Naba Bikram Kishore Tripura is one of the prominent government official who holds different position during his government service holder.
He was the Chairman of Chittagong Hill Tracts Development Board. He served as Secretary of Ministry of Chittagong Hill Tracts Affairs from 2011 to 2018.. 
He served As an Ambassador at Ministry of Foreign Affairs (Bangladesh) from 2010 to 2011. Before that, he was holding the position of Additional Inspector General. of Bangladesh Police which is the Second in Command on Bangladesh Police.

Education
Naba Bikram Kishore Tripura was born at Rangamati Hill District and he completed his Primary and High School Education from Rangamati.
After that he went to Dhaka College and participated in Bangladesh Liberation War. He completed undergraduate and graduate studies in English Language at the University of Dhaka.

Career
In 1982, Tripura Joined as Assistant Superintendent of Police (ASP) of Bangladesh Police
after completing Bangladesh Public Civil Service Exam.

While serving as Bangladesh's first mission deputy contingent commander in the US-led "Operation Uphold Democracy in Haiti" in the Western Hemisphere in 1994, he was awarded by the US Department of Defense's "Commanders Award for Public Service" for outstanding performance. (UNMHA) and won the United Nations Medal. 

During the Bangladesh Nationalist Party rule from 2001 to 2006, Tripura was denied promotion along with other religious minorities and people from Gopalganj District who were viewed as being loyal to the opposition Awami League. He was the deputy commissioner of Chittagong Metropolitan Police in 2001. He was posted in the Criminal Investigation Department in 2002 as special superintendent. He was afterwards transferred to Khulna Range. He was then posted at the Bangladesh Police Academy and Detective Training School. He was sent to study at the National Defence College in 2005. In 2007, he was appointed Additional Inspector General of Bangladesh Police. 

Tripura, in his long career has held important positions of commanding, staff and instruction. He was twice elected President of the Bangladesh Police Service Association. He was the managing director of the Bangladesh Police Co-operative Society and Editor-in-Chief of the "Intelligence Department" from 2007 to 2010. He was appointed in March 2007 as the National Project Director of the Police Reform Program and held the post until 6 October 2010, when he joined the Ministry of Foreign Affairs. He was appointed the acting Secretary of the Ministry of Chittagong Hill Tracts Affairs on16 June 2011. In 2012, he was made a full secretary of the government of Bangladesh.

Tripura was elected Chairman of the International Center for Integrated Mountain Development (ICIMDD), Board of Governors in 2016. The International Center for Integrated Mountain Development, an intergovernmental regional organization, was established in 1983 with 8 (eight) regional members - Afghanistan, Pakistan, India, Nepal, Bhutan, China, Myanmar and Bangladesh.

Tripura was the Secretary of the Ministry of Chittagong Hill Tracts Affairs from 16 June 2011 to February 28, 2018. From December 2013 to February 2018, he was the Chairman of the Chittagong Hill Tracts Development Board (CHTDB). He was reappointed Chairman of the Board in March 2018.

References 

Living people
1956 births
People from Rangamati District
Bangladeshi police officers
Bangladeshi civil servants
Tripuri people
Bangladeshi Hindus
National Defence College (Bangladesh) alumni